Bluerock Wildland Provincial Park is a wildland provincial park located in Kananaskis Improvement District, Alberta, Canada. The park was named for the Bluerock Creek that flows through and forms part of the western boundary of the park and Bluerock Mountain which is the creek's source. The park is included in the South Saskatchewan Region Land-use framework region and managed by the South Saskatchewan Regional Plan. And because they are so intertwined, Sheep River Provincial Park and Bluerock Wildland Provincial Park are managed under the same Management Plan.

Location
The park surrounds Sheep River Provincial Park and adjoins Elbow-Sheep Wildland Provincial Park on the western boundary. It also touches Don Getty Wildland Provincial Park on the northwest and southwest. On the north, south and east, the park abuts the Rocky Mountains Forest Reserve and the Kananaskis Country Forest Land Use Zone. It is part of the Kananaskis Country park system.

Ecology
The park protects the Sheep River watershed and extends ecological preservation from the Elbow-Sheep Wildland Provincial Park to the eastern boundary of Kananaskis Country. It connects Sheep River Provincial Park with the other provincial and national parks along the eastern slope of the Rocky Mountains. The Sheep River, a tributary of the Bow and South Saskatchewan Rivers, is an important source of drinking water for downstream users and must be managed to maintain existing flows and high water quality. The Rocky Mountains Forest Reserve was created for "the conservation of the forests... and for the maintenance of conditions favourable to an optimum water supply".

The park contains the Alpine, Sub-Alpine and Montane subregions of the Rocky Mountain Natural Region and provides a transition zone between the Rocky Mountain and Foothills Natural Regions. It provides a travel corridor for numerous wildlife species including elk, moose, bighorn sheep, white-tailed deer, mule deer, wolves, grizzly bears, black bears and cougars.

Activities 
There are no designated backcountry campgrounds so only random backcountry camping is available. front and backcountry hiking, equestrian, and mountain biking/cycling are permissible on existing trails. Geocaching is available. Hunting and Fishing are allowed with advanced permits.

See also 
 List of provincial parks in Alberta
 List of Canadian provincial parks
 Ecology of the Rocky Mountains

References

External links 
 Kananaskis Country
 

Provincial parks of Alberta
Kananaskis Improvement District